Kureh Kani (also Romanized as Kūreh Kānī) is a village in Il Gavark Rural District in the Central District of Bukan County, West Azerbaijan Province, Iran. At the 2006 census, its population was 159, in 24 families.

References 

Populated places in Bukan County